Ruth Weiss may refer to:

 Ruth Weiss (beat poet) (1928–2020), German-Austrian poet, performer, playwright and artist in the American Beat generation
 Ruth Weiss (journalist) (1908–2006, also known as Wèi Lùshī), Austrian-Chinese educator, journalist and lecturer
 Ruth Weiss (writer) (born 1924), German writer who focuses on anti-racism
 Ruth A. Weiss, British software engineer 
 Ruth Dolores Weiss (born 1978), Israeli musician